USS Catbird (AM-68) was the lead ship of her class of two naval trawlers, which were operated as minesweepers by the United States Navy during World War II.

Built in 1938 by Charleston Shipbuilding and Dry Dock Co., Charleston, South Carolina, as MV Bittern, the ship was acquired by the U.S. Navy on 12 August 1940, and commissioned on 27 November 1940.

World War II East Coast operations  
USS Catbird operated in New England waters through 31 March 1941, engaged in tests and exercises. After overhaul at Brooklyn, New York, she sailed on 5 October for Cristobal where she remained until 29 January 1944, on duty in the 15th Naval District. Returning to the east coast she engaged in local operations at Norfolk, Virginia, until 16 April 1944 when she sailed to Boston, Massachusetts, arriving 19 April.

Reclassified as IX-183 
She was reclassified as Unclassified Miscellaneous Auxiliary IX-183 on 15 August 1944, and was placed out of commission in service 17 August 1944.
 
Catbird provided services out of New York until 23 May 1945, then operated in Cape Cod waters until 3 June under direction of Naval Mine Testing Facilities.

End of service 
Returning to New York on 4 June, she was placed out of service and laid up 7 November 1945, and transferred to the Maritime Commission for disposal on 24 January 1947.

References

External links 
 

 

Catbird-class minesweepers
Ships built in Charleston, South Carolina
1938 ships
World War II minesweepers of the United States